Housefull Movies is an Indian cable and satellite 24-hour Hindi movie television channel that was owned by Swami Films Entertainment Pvt Ltd. The channel was launched on 1 September 2015 and replaced TV24 News, after the news channel was removed due to non-renewal of contract. The free-to-air channel faces stiff competition from the likes of Hindi movie channels, like Zee Cinema, SET Max, Star Gold and many more.

See also
Cinema TV

References

2015 establishments in Maharashtra
Television channels and stations established in 2015
Television stations in Mumbai
Movie channels in India
Hindi-language television channels in India